Acinetobacter tjernbergiae is a Gram-negative, strictly aerobic bacterium from the genus  Acinetobacter isolated from a wastewater treatment plant.

References

External links
Type strain of Acinetobacter tjernbergiae at BacDive -  the Bacterial Diversity Metadatabase

Moraxellaceae
Bacteria described in 2003